Cornelio Firmano (died 5 Jul 1588) was a Roman Catholic prelate who served as Bishop of Osimo (1574–1588).

Biography
On 9 Jan 1574, Cornelio Firmano was appointed during the papacy of Pope Gregory XIII as Bishop of Osimo. On 21 Feb 1574, he was consecrated bishop by Scipione Rebiba, Cardinal-Bishop of Albano. He served as Bishop of Osimo until his death on 5 Jul 1588. While bishop, he was the principal co-consecrator of Filippo Sega, Bishop of Ripatransone (1575); and Niccolò Aragonio (Aragona), Bishop of Ripatransone (1578)

References 

16th-century Italian Roman Catholic bishops
Bishops appointed by Pope Gregory XIII
1588 deaths